Archilema modiolus is a moth of the subfamily Arctiinae. It is found in Kenya and Uganda.

References

Moths described in 1958
Lithosiini
Moths of Africa